Gert Van Mol (born 1969) is a Belgian media entrepreneur.

Van Mol studied at the Catholic University of Louvain. While studying he founded The Publishing Company, a publishing house, in 1990. Between 1990 and 2000 The Publishing Company published a series of youth magazines and books, such as TEEK magazine.

In 2011 Van Mol started as manager of the digital TV-channel Life!TV Broadcasting Company. In his capacity he introduced the first female presenter with a headscarf on Belgian TV.

In 2018 Van Mol acquired the Flemish far-right website 't Scheldt. Though he continues to deny it, leaked documents revealed he is the owner of the website.

References

Flemish businesspeople
KU Leuven alumni
Belgian businesspeople
1969 births
Living people